NGC 810 is an unbarred elliptical galaxy located in the constellation Cetus, approximately 360 million light-years from the Milky Way. It was discovered by the French astronomer Édouard Stephan in 1871.

NGC 810 is currently in a merger event. It is interacting with the galaxy SDSS J020529.28+131503.5.

See also 
 List of NGC objects (1–1000)

References 

Cetus (constellation)
Elliptical galaxies
0810
007965